Will Miller (born June 13, 1984) is an American rower. He is a five time US National Team Member and competed in the Men's eight event at the 2012 Summer Olympics placing 4th. His father, Bill Miller, was also a US Olympic rower.

References

External links
 

1984 births
Living people
American male rowers
Olympic rowers of the United States
Rowers at the 2012 Summer Olympics
Rowers from Boston